The Sri Lanka men's national volleyball team represents Sri Lanka in international volleyball competitions and friendly matches, governed by Sri Lanka Volleyball Federation (SLVF).

Asian Championship

Asian Games

References

V
National men's volleyball teams
Volleyball in Sri Lanka
Men's sport in Sri Lanka